The Tribune Tower is a , 36-floor neo-Gothic skyscraper located at 435 North Michigan Avenue in Chicago, Illinois, United States. Built between 1923 and 1925, the international design competition for the tower became a historic event in 20th-century architecture.

The tower was the home of the Chicago Tribune, Tribune Media, Tribune Broadcasting, and Tribune Publishing. WGN Radio (720 kHz) originated broadcasts from the building until moving to 303 Wacker Drive in June 2018. The last WGN Radio broadcast left from the Tribune Tower on June 18, 2018. The ground level formerly housed the large restaurant Howells & Hood (named for the building's architects), now closed, whose patio overlooked nearby Pioneer Court and Michigan Avenue. CNN's Chicago bureau was also located in the building. It is listed as a Chicago Landmark and is a contributing property to the Michigan–Wacker Historic District. The original Tribune Tower was built in 1868, but was destroyed in the Great Chicago Fire in 1871.

Design competition
In 1922 the Chicago Tribune hosted an international interior and exterior design competition for its new headquarters to mark its 75th anniversary, and offered $100,000 in prize money with a $50,000 first prize for "the most beautiful and distinctive office building in the world". The competition worked brilliantly for months as a publicity stunt, and the resulting entries still reveal a unique turning point in American architectural history. More than 260 entries were received.

The winner was a neo-Gothic design by New York architects John Mead Howells and Raymond Hood, with buttresses near the top.

The entry that many perceived as the best, by the Finnish architect Eliel Saarinen, took second place and received $20,000. Saarinen's tower was preferred by architects like Louis Sullivan, and was a strong influence on the next generation of skyscrapers, including Raymond Hood's own subsequent work on the McGraw-Hill Building and the Rockefeller Center. The 1929 Gulf Building in Houston, Texas, designed by architects Alfred C. Finn, Kenneth Franzheim, and J. E. R. Carpenter, is a close realization of that Saarinen design. César Pelli's 181 West Madison Street Building in Chicago is also thought to be inspired by Saarinen's design.

Other Tribune tower entries by figures like Walter Gropius, Bertram Goodhue, Bruno Taut, and Adolf Loos remain intriguing suggestions of what might have been, but perhaps not as intriguing as the one surmounted by a Mount Rushmore-like head of an American Indian. These entries were originally published by the Tribune Company in 1923 under the title Tribune Tower Competition and later in The Chicago Tribune Tower Competition: Skyscraper Design and Cultural Change in the 1920s by Katherine Solomonson, 2001.

In the 1980 book entitled The Tribune Tower Competition published by Rizzoli, authors Robert A. M. Stern, Stanley Tigerman as well as Bruce Abbey and other architects jokingly submitted "late entries" in Volume II of the work.

Archival materials regarding the competition and the building are held by the Ryerson & Burnham Libraries at the Art Institute of Chicago.

The building

Design
By 1922 the neo-Gothic skyscraper had become an established design tactic, with the first important so-called "American Perpendicular Style" at Cass Gilbert's Woolworth Building of 1913. This was a late example, perhaps the last important example, and criticized for its perceived historicism. Construction on the Tribune Tower was completed in 1925 and reached a height of 462 feet (141 m) above ground. The ornate buttresses surrounding the peak of the tower are especially visible when the tower is lit at night.

As was the case with most of Hood's projects, the sculptures and decorations were made by the American artist Rene Paul Chambellan. The tower features carved images of Robin Hood (Hood) and a howling dog (Howells) near the main entrance to commemorate the architects. The top of the tower is designed after the Tour de beurre (″butter tower″) of the Rouen Cathedral in France, which is characteristic of the Late-Gothic style, that is to say, without a spire but with a crown-shaped top.

Rene Paul Chambellan contributed his sculpture talents to the buildings ornamentation, gargoyles and the famous Aesops' Screen over the main entrance doors. Rene Chambellan worked on other projects with Raymond Hood including the American Radiator Building and Rockefeller Center in New York City. Also, among the gargoyles on the Tribune Tower is one of a frog. That piece was created by Rene Chambellan to represent himself jokingly as he is of French ancestry.

Collection of famous building fragments

Prior to the building of the Tribune Tower, correspondents for the Chicago Tribune brought back rocks and bricks from a variety of historically important sites throughout the world at the request of Colonel McCormick. Many of these fragments have been incorporated into the lowest levels of the building and are labeled with their location of origin. Stones included in the wall are from such sites as the St. Stephen's Cathedral, Trondheim Cathedral, Taj Mahal, Clementine Hall, the Parthenon, Hagia Sophia, Corregidor Island, Palace of Westminster, petrified wood from the Redwood National and State Parks, the Great Pyramid, The Alamo, Notre Dame de Paris, Abraham Lincoln's Tomb, the Great Wall of China, Independence Hall, Fort Santiago, Angkor Wat, Ta Prohm, Wawel Castle, Banteay Srei, and Rouen Cathedral's Butter Tower, which inspired the shape of the building.

Some of these had a political or social context, such as the stone from the Berlin Wall. The column fragment of Wawel Castle, located in its own niche over the upper-left corner of the main entrance, is a visual tribute to Chicago's large Polish population, the largest such presence outside of the Republic of Poland. There are 149 fragments in the building. In 1999, during a celebration of the 30th anniversary of the Apollo 11 mission, Buzz Aldrin presented a rock brought from the Moon, which was displayed in a window in the Tribune gift store (it could not be added to the wall, as NASA owns a large majority of the Apollo Moon rocks, and this one was merely on loan to the Tribune). The rock was removed in 2011 due to an outdated display. A new rock display is planned but has not been installed . A piece of steel recovered from the World Trade Center has been added to the wall.

Buildings influenced by the Tower
Several buildings around the world make reference to the design of the Tribune Tower, most notably in Australia: the spires of the Grace Building in Sydney and the Manchester Unity Building in Melbourne. Additionally, the architects of One Atlantic Center located in the Midtown section of Atlanta were influenced by the building which is most evident in the shaft of the building as well as the base.

Freedom Museum
On April 11, 2006, the McCormick Tribune Freedom Museum opened, occupying two stories of the building, including the previous location of high-end gift store Hammacher Schlemmer. The museum closed this location on March 1, 2009, and redirected its efforts to become an online museum.

Open House Chicago
Tribune Tower has participated in Chicago Architecture Foundation's event Open House Chicago every year, starting in 2011. This annual opportunity allows visitors to tour the interior of the building for free.

Condo conversion 
The Chicago Tribune, the building's main tenant since it opened, moved out in June 2018, in order for the building to be converted to condos. The conversion of the building is set to cost more than $500 million. The conversion has run into some legal troubles regarding the sign: the Chicago Tribune contends that the sign is their intellectual property, so it can not remain on the building, but the developers stated that they had a contractual agreement to buy the sign for one dollar. Col. Robert R. McCormick's former iconic office on the 24th floor will be turned into offices. In the former parking lot for Tribune Tower, there are plans to build Tribune Tower East, a super-tall skyscraper that would become the city's second-tallest.

In popular culture
 On November 21 and 28, 2007, in episodes entitled "One Wedding and a Funeral" and "The Thing About Heroes" of the television series CSI: NY, historical pieces stolen from the building led Mac Taylor (Gary Sinise) to his hometown of Chicago. Upon further investigation of the man stalking him, Taylor found a dead body in an office of an unused floor in the building. The episodes were filmed entirely on location in Chicago.
 Conan O'Brien was seen running past the tower while en route from New York to Los Angeles on his first episode as host of The Tonight Show.
 The snipers in Transformers: Dark of the Moon are shooting from the 26th floor of the Tribune Tower just below the buttresses.

See also

 Chicago architecture
 Open House Chicago

References

External links

 
 1925 – Chicago Tribune Tower, Chicago, Illinois at Archiseek
 Saarinen's second place entry
 "Tribune Tower could be for sale" – Chicago Tribune, June 25, 2008
 Impact of competition entries on skyscraper design
 The Crown at the Tribune Tower
 Howells & Hood restaurant
 Tribune Tower Events
 Tribune Tower at Art Atlas—high-resolution 360° panoramas and images
 Article in Western Architect (1925) with original floor plans

Skyscraper office buildings in Chicago
Central Chicago
Chicago Tribune
Newspaper headquarters in the United States
Newspaper buildings
Mass media company headquarters in the United States
Office buildings completed in 1925
Gothic Revival skyscrapers
Gothic Revival architecture in Illinois
1925 establishments in Illinois
Chicago Landmarks